Saurita nigripalpia is a moth in the subfamily Arctiinae. It was described by George Hampson in 1898. It is found in Mexico and Costa Rica.

References

Moths described in 1898
Saurita